This is a list of notable pharmacists, sorted by particular fields in which they distinguished themselves:

Pharmacy practice
Dora Akunyili (1954-2010),  Director General of National Agency for Food and Drug Administration and Control of Nigeria
George F. Archambault (1910–2001), considered to be the "father" of consultant pharmacy
Sabina Baldoncelli (b. 1781), one of the first Italian female pharmacists with a university degree but was allowed to work only in an orphanage
Philo Carpenter (1805–1886), first pharmacist in Chicago, Illinois
Maria Dauerer  (1624–1688), first Swedish female apothecary
Edna Gleason, American pharmacist and "mother of fair-trade"
Elizabeth Gooking Greenleaf (1681–1762), first American female apothecary
Elsie Higgon (1879–1969), English pharmacist and president of the National Association of Women Pharmacists
Isa Marte Hussaini (born 1956), Nigerian pharmacist and fellow of the Nigerian Academy of Science
Tadeusz Pankiewicz (1908–1993), Polish pharmacist in the Kraków Ghetto
William Procter, Jr. (1817–1872), regarded as the "father of American pharmacy", was instrumental in the founding of the American Pharmaceutical Association in 1852
Joseph P. Remington, namesake of the Remington Medal
R. Tim Webster (1946–2003), founder and long-time executive director of the American Society of Consultant Pharmacists
Harvey A. K. Whitney (1894–1957), founder and first president of the American Society of Health-System Pharmacists in 1942
Suzanne Rabi Soliman (born 1980), founder Pharmacist Moms Group and Women Pharmacist Day

Pharmacy business
George H. Bartell, Sr. (1868–1956), American founder of Bartell Drugs, the oldest family–owned drug store chain in the United States
David Bernauer, American, former CEO of Walgreens drug store chain
Jesse Boot (1850–1931), British businessman and transformer of the Boots Pharmacy/Drug Company into a national retailer
John Boot (1815–1860), British founder of Boots the Chemists
Ornella Barra, Italian, Chief Executive, Pharmaceutical Wholesale Division Alliance Boots 
Jean Coutu (born 1927), French Canadian founder of the Jean Coutu Group
Jack Eckerd (1913–2004), owner/founder of Eckerd Drugs
 David Jack (1924–2011), leader of research that developed major asthma drugs
Murray Koffler (1924–2017), founder of Canadian drug store chain Shoppers Drug Mart
Ernest Mario, American pharmaceutical industry executive
Jeff Rein (born 1953), former CEO of Walgreens drug store chain
Thomas Ryan, American, former CEO of CVS Caremark drug store chain
Charles Rudolph Walgreen (1873–1939), founder of Walgreens Drugstore

Botany and chemistry
Jean Baptiste Christophore Fusée Aublet (1720–1778), French botanist and explorer
Ibn al-Baitar (1197–1248), Islamic physician, pharmacist, botanist, and scientist from the Middle Ages
Bill Charman, Australian pharmaceutical scientist 
Stanley Stewart Davis (born 1942), winner of Eurand Award for Outstanding Research in Oral Drug Delivery
Georg Joseph Kamel (1661–1706), Czech Jesuit missionary and botanist
John Uri Lloyd (1849–1936), influential American pharmacist 
Charles Mohr (1824–1901), German botanist 
James Parkinson, English apothecary and namesake of the disease Parkinson's
Ruiz y Pavón (1850–1931), Ruiz and Pavón, Spanish famous pharmacists
Pierre Joseph Pelletier (1788–1842), co-discoverer of quinine, caffeine, and strychnine
James Petiver (ca. 1664–1718), botanist and entomologist, considered the "father of British butterflies"
Sara Borrell Ruiz (1917–1999), Spanish steroid hormone researcher
Carl Wilhelm Scheele (1742–1786), German-Swedish chemist, discoverer of oxygen
Wilbur Scoville (1865–1942), American developer of the Scoville Organoleptic Test
Friedrich Sertürner (1783–1841), German chemist and discover of morphine
Eugène Soubeiran (1797–1859), French discover of chloroform

Industry
Paul Carl Beiersdorf (1836–1896), German founder of Beiersdorf AG
Herbert Haft (1920–2004), American corporate raider
Oscar Troplowitz (1863–1918), German entrepreneur and owner of Beiersdorf AG
Ignacy Łukasiewicz (1822–1882), Polish pharmacist, inventor of kerosene lamp, pioneer of oil industry in Europe

Soft drinks
Charles Alderton (1857–1941), American inventor of the soft drink Dr Pepper
Caleb Bradham (1867–1934), American inventor of the soft drink Pepsi
Charles Elmer Hires (1851–1937), American inventor of the soft drink Hires Root Beer
John Pemberton (1831–1888), American inventor of the soft drink Coca-Cola
James Vernor (1843–1927), American inventor of Vernor's ginger ale

Politics
Lawrence Brock (1906–1968), Nebraskan politician
Buddy Carter (born 1957), politician from Georgia USA
Ikililou Dhoinine (born 1962), Comorian politician
Misako Enoki (born 1945), Japanese feminist, pharmacist, and politician
Pravin Gordhan (born 1949), minister in South African government
John Hodges (born 1937), Australian politician 
Chuck Hopson (born 1941), Texas politician
Hubert Humphrey (1911–1978), pharmacist and 38th Vice President of the United States
Altaf Hussain (born 1961), Pakistani politician; founder of APMSO and of MQM, the third largest political party of Pakistan
Cornelius Comegys Jadwin (1835–1913), Republican member of the U.S. House of Representatives from Pennsylvania
Ronnie Johns (born 1949), Louisiana state legislator
Tony Lamb (born 1939), Australian politician 
Bernard LeBas (born 1943), Louisiana state legislator 
Antonio Luna (1866–1899), Philippine General
Nancy McFarlane (born 1956), mayor of Raleigh, North Carolina
Randy McNally (born 1944), Tennessee politician
Fred Mills (born 1955), member of the Louisiana State Senate
Robert Nutting (born 1947), member of the Maine House of Representatives
Dave O'Neal (1937–2021), Lieutenant Governor of Illinois
Oscar Rennebohm (1889–1968), 32nd Governor of Wisconsin (1947–1951)
George H. Ryan (born 1934), Illinois Governor
Charlie Smithgall (born 1945), Mayor of Lancaster, Pennsylvania
 Ron Stephens (born 1954), member of Georgia House of Representatives
Harve Tibbott (1885–1969), Republican politician and U.S. House of Representatives from Pennsylvania
Evan Vickers (born 1954), Utah politician
Gerry Weiner (born 1933), Canadian politician; former Progressive Conservative Party of Canada MP and cabinet minister, president of the Equality Party and mayor of Dollard-des-Ormeaux, Quebec
Terry White (born 1936), Australian businessman and politician
Jim Wilson (1872–1956), pioneering banker and Los Angeles City Council member

Other
Adaeze Atuegwu (born 1977), Nigerian-American author, pharmacist, and disability inclusion advocate
Michel Casseux (1794–1869), French developer of Savate
 Étienne J. Caire (1868–1955), Louisiana merchant
Theodor Fontane (1819–1898), German novelist and poet
O. Henry (1862–1910), American writer, real name William Sidney Porter
Colin Murdoch (1929–2008), New Zealand inventor (tranquilizer gun, disposable hypodermic syringe, child–proof medicine container) 
 Edna O'Brien (born 1930), Irish author and playwright
John O'Grady, Australian writer They're a Weird Mob)
Pat Ogrin (born 1958), American football player
Alberto de Oliveira (1855–1937), Brazilian poet, pharmacist and professor
 Hans Christian Ørsted (1777–1851), Danish physicist who discovered electromagnetism
György Pásztor, International Ice Hockey Federation doping in sport committee chairman
Jean-Claude Pressac (1944–2003), French chemist and authority on the Holocaust of World War II
Nina Radojičić (born 1968), Serbian pharmacist and singer, represented Serbia in the Eurovision Song Contest 2011
Daniel B Smith (1792–1883), American educator
 Joseph Swan (1828–1914), inventor of the incandescent light bulb
Naoko Takeuchi (born 1957), Japanese pharmacist, manga artist best known for work on Sailor Moon
John Worsfold (born 1968), Australian football player

Fictional pharmacists
Douglas "Doug" Varney (Sam Rockwell) in Better Living Through Chemistry
Eddie Walzer (Paul Schulze) in Nurse Jackie
Percival Almanac (Barry Otto) in The Dressmaker
Yusuf (Dileep Rao) in Inception
Ned Flanders (Harry Shearer) in the early seasons of The Simpsons

References

Pharmacist
Pharmacists
Pharmacists